Clarence Adams may refer to:

 Clarence Adams (boxer) (born 1974), American boxer
 Clarence Adams (Korean War) (1930–1999), African-American GI during the Korean War
 Clarence H. Adams (1905–1987), American government official and businessman
 Clarence Raymond Adams (1898–1965), American mathematician